The Falmouth Cutter 26 is an American sailboat that was designed by Lyle Hess as a cruiser.

Production
The design was built by Russell Yachts in Morehead City, North Carolina, United States. Nine boats were completed, but it is now out of production.

Design
The Falmouth Cutter 26 is a recreational keelboat, built predominantly of fiberglass, with wood trim. It is a cutter rigged sloop with a plumb stem, an angled transom, a keel and transom-hung rudder controlled by a tiller and a fixed long keel. It displaces  and carries  of lead ballast.

See also
List of sailing boat types

Related development
Bristol Channel Cutter
Falmouth Cutter 22
Falmouth Cutter 34
Nor'Sea 27

References

Keelboats
Sailing yachts
Sailboat type designs by Lyle Hess
Sailboat types built by Russell Yachts